The tundra climate is a polar climate sub-type located in high latitudes and high mountains. It is classified as ET according to Köppen climate classification.

Despite the potential diversity of climates in the ET category involving precipitation, extreme temperatures, and relative wet and dry seasons, this category is rarely subdivided. Rainfall and snowfall are generally slight due to the low vapor pressure of water in the chilly atmosphere, but as a rule potential evapotranspiration is extremely low, allowing soggy terrain of swamps and bogs even in places that get precipitation typical of deserts of lower and middle latitudes. The amount of native tundra biomass depends more on the local temperature than the amount of precipitation.

There also exists an oceanic variety of the tundra climate with cool to mild winters (the coldest month averaging around 0°C) which borders the subpolar climate (Cfc) and is found in parts of Iceland, the Aleutian Islands and most predominantly on subantarctic islands.

See also
 Polar climate
 Köppen climate classification

References

Climate
Köppen climate types